The 1944 Clemson Tigers football team was an American football that represented Clemson College as a member of the Southern Conference during the 1944 college football season. In their fifth season under head coach Frank Howard, the Tigers compiled a 4–5 record (3–1 against conference opponents), finished seventh in the conference, and were outscored by a total of 179 to 165. The team played its home games at Memorial Stadium in Clemson, South Carolina.

Center Ralph Jenkins was the team captain for the second consecutive year. He was also selected as a first-team player on the 1944 All-Southern Conference football team. The team's statistical leaders included tailback Sid Tinsley with 248 passing yards and 479 rushing yards and fullback Billy G. Rogers with 37 points scored (6 touchdowns and 1 extra point).

Six Clemson players were selected on the 1944 All-South Carolina football team: tackles Harley Phillips and Phil Prince; guard Tom Salisbury; center Ralph Jenkins; and backs Sid Tinsley and Billy G. Rogers.

Schedule

References

Clemson
Clemson Tigers football seasons
Clemson Tigers football